Tom Sinclair (born 1957) was the 1979 NCAA Division I national champion for the javelin throw . He competed for the University of Washington. At Washington, Sinclair was a multi-year All-American. Tom Sinclair also holds the Washington state high school (WIAA) record for the javelin throw at 239-1.

After a second-place finish at Pac-10s, and fourth at the NCAA Championships during his junior year, in Sinclair's senior season he was the Pac-10 champion and went on to win the 1979 NCAA championship with a throw of 261-3, which, at the time, was the University of Illinois stadium record.

Tom Sinclair set the Washington state javelin record in 1975, competing for the Peninsula High School Seahawks, in a dual meet against Curtis High School. The record still stands due to rule changes that altered the quality of the javelin' s flight to prevent the implement from traveling as far.

External links
 Brian McLean, "Javelin record still stands after 30 years", The Peninsula Gateway, June 30, 2005
Mason Kelley, "Father and son thrown a second chance", The Seattle Times, April 26, 2010

Living people
1958 births
American male javelin throwers
Sportspeople from Redmond, Washington